Abish Mathew is an Indian stand-up comedian and YouTuber. He is known for his work with All India Bakchod, as the creator and host of a late night show Son of Abish and Journey Of A Joke, Comedians on Board (A Youtube Tournament series by Samay Raina) and as the host of Comicstaan.

Personal life

He got engaged to actress and YouTuber Archana Kavi in 2015. They later separated.

Career 
He began his career as a radio jockey at Red FM, Delhi before switching to stand-up comedy.

He has a YouTube channel called Son Of Abish, and another called Journey of a Joke.

In 2018 Abish appeared in an Amazon PrimeVideo special, Whoop.

Controversy 
Abish was in news in May 2021 after a nine year old tweet of his on Mayawati resurfaced. Later, an unconditional apology was given by Abish.

References

Indian stand-up comedians
Living people
Indian YouTubers
Year of birth missing (living people)